Lejdi Liçaj (born 19 January 1987) is an Albanian professional footballer who plays as a midfielder for Flamurtari Vlorë in the Albanian Superliga.

Club career

Flamurtari Vlorë
On 18 July 2017, Liçaj agreed personal terms and joined Flamurtari Vlorë for a third time. The transfer was made official, with the player signing a deal for the upcoming season. He scored his first goal of the season on 19 November in his fifth league appearance against Lushnja; his 91st minute overhead kick was the lone goal of the match.

On 19 January 2018, Liçaj left the club after celebrating his 31st birthday with his teammates. His third spell at his boyhood club ended with 13 appearances between league and cup, scoring three times.

Luftëtari Gjirokastër
On 19 January 2018, Luftëtari Gjirokastër announced to have signed Liçaj, thus returning him for a third spell at Bluzinjtë. He made his third debut for the club one week later by coming on in 7th minute for the injured Oltion Rapa in an eventual 2–0 home win against Skënderbeu Korçë. He scored his first goal of his third spell later on 14 March in the match against Kukësi, a header which put Luftëtari ahead as the match ended 2–1. The goal prompted Luftëtari fans to nickname him "Chinese Roberto Carlos".

Back to Flamurtari Vlorë
On 5 January 2019, Liçaj returned to Flamurtari Vlorë.

Honours
Flamurtari Vlorë
Albanian Cup: 2008–09, 2013–14

Luftëtari Gjirokastër
Albanian First Division: 2015–16

References

External links

1987 births
Living people
Footballers from Vlorë
Albanian footballers
Association football midfielders
KF Apolonia Fier players
Flamurtari Vlorë players
KF Skënderbeu Korçë players
Luftëtari Gjirokastër players
KF Bylis Ballsh players
Kategoria Superiore players
Kategoria e Parë players